Thalassomedon (from Greek, thalassa, "sea" and Greek, medon, "lord" or "ruler", meaning "sea lord") is a genus of plesiosaur, named by Welles in 1943.

Description
 
The neck is also very long; it comprises 62 vertebrae and is about  - over half of the total length. Stones have been found in its stomach area leading some to theorize that they were used for ballast or digestion. If the latter, stomach action would cause the stones to help grind ingested food.

Discovery
 
This genus of plesiosaur lived in North America, approximately 95 million years ago - this places it during the Cenomanian stage. Its closest relative is Elasmosaurus, and both belong to the family Elasmosauridae. There are six specimens of varying states of preservation on display at various museums in the United States.

See also

 List of plesiosaur genera
 Timeline of plesiosaur research

References

External links
The skeleton
About plesiosaurs
More of the skeleton

Late Cretaceous plesiosaurs of North America
Elasmosaurids
Fossil taxa described in 1943
Taxa named by Samuel Paul Welles
Sauropterygian genera